List of people from Georgia may refer to:

List of Georgians (from the country of Georgia)
List of people from Georgia (U.S. state)